The first season of Riverdale premiered on The CW on January 26, 2017 and concluded on May 11, 2017, with a total of 13 episodes. The series is based on the characters from the Archie Comics, created by Maurice Coyne, Louis Silberkleit, and John L. Goldwater, and was created by Roberto Aguirre-Sacasa. 

The principal cast included the core four characters of the series Archie Andrews (KJ Apa), Betty Cooper (Lili Reinhart), Veronica Lodge (Camila Mendes), and Jughead Jones (Cole Sprouse), who also serves as the series narrator. Other cast members included Veronica's mother Hermione Lodge (Marisol Nichols), fellow students Cheryl Blossom (Madelaine Petsch) and Josie McCoy (Ashleigh Murray), Betty's mother Alice Cooper (Mädchen Amick), and Archie's father Fred Andrews (Luke Perry).

The first season focuses on the town of Riverdale in the aftermath of the death of Jason Blossom (Trevor Stines), who supposedly drowned the summer before school started.

Episodes

Cast and characters

Main 
 KJ Apa as Archie Andrews
 Lili Reinhart as Betty Cooper
 Camila Mendes as Veronica Lodge
 Cole Sprouse as Jughead Jones
 Marisol Nichols as Hermione Lodge
 Madelaine Petsch as Cheryl Blossom
 Ashleigh Murray as Josie McCoy
 Mädchen Amick as Alice Cooper
 Luke Perry as Fred Andrews

Recurring 
{{columns-list|colwidth=40em|
 Casey Cott as Kevin Keller
 Martin Cummins as Tom Keller
 Robin Givens as Sierra McCoy
 Nathalie Boltt as Penelope Blossom
 Lochlyn Munro as Hal Cooper
 Colin Lawrence as Floyd Clayton
 Peter James Bryant as Waldo Weatherbee
 Sarah Habel as Geraldine Grundy
 Jordan Calloway as Chuck Clayton
 Rob Raco as Joaquin DeSantos
 Asha Bromfield as Melody Valentine
 Cody Kearsley as Marmaduke "Moose" Mason
 Hayley Law as Valerie Brown
 Shannon Purser as Ethel Muggs
 Trevor Stines as Jason Blossom
 Olivia Ryan Stern as Tina Patel
 Caitlin Mitchell-Markovitch as Ginger Lopez
 Major Curda as Dilton Doiley
Daniel Yang portrays Dilton Doiley in the pilot
 Tiera Skovbye as Polly Cooper
 Barclay Hope as Clifford Blossom
Alvin Sanders as Pop Tate<ref>{{cite web |url=https://sciencefiction.com/2016/08/31/stranger-things-barb-moving-riverdale/ |title='Stranger Things Barb Is Moving To 'Riverdale' |last=Motes |first=Jax |date=August 31, 2016 |website=ScienceFiction.com |language=en-US |access-date=April 24, 2020}}</ref>
 Tom McBeath as Smithers
 Molly Ringwald as Mary Andrews
 Casey Cott as Kevin Keller
 Skeet Ulrich as F.P Jones
 Ross Butler as Reggie Mantle
}}

 Guest 
 Mackenzie Gray as Dr. Curdle
 Adain Bradley as Trev Brown
 Raúl Castillo as Oscar Castillo
 Reese Alexander as Myles McCoy
 Alison Araya as Ms. Weiss
 Scott McNeil as Tall Boy
 Barbara Wallace as Rose Blossom
 Moses Thiessen as Ben Button

 Production 

 Development 
Originally in development at Fox, it was announced in 2014 that Warner Bros TV would be producing the series through Berlanti Productions as Robert Aguirre-Sacasa, Greg Berlanti (creator of Supergirl and Arrow), and Sarah Schechter, and Jon Goldwater, the CEO of Archie Comics as executive producers. In July 2015, it was announced that Riverdale had moved to The CW and that Aguirre-Sacasa would be writing the pilot episode. On January 29, 2016, The CW officially ordered a pilot and on May 16, 2016 it was picked up for series. In November 2016, it was announced the first episode would air on January 26, 2017.

 Writing 
Robert Aguirre-Sacasa stated that the show was not directly inspired by the comics reboot that occurred in 2015, as the show had already been pitched to Fox at that point. He also stated he was aware that the show needed to be more accessible for a modern audience, unlike the original comics. He stated that the show would follow a serialized, neo-noir format. At San Diego Comic Con 2016, Aguirre-Sacasa explained that the first season would follow what happened to Jason Blossom, a teen who died the summer before school started and stated that the murder solving would not be dragged out. Talking about the darker themes of the show, he states he was inspired by coming of ages films such as Stand By Me and River's Edge. He said that he thought, "What would a coming of age story be like, if David Lynch made it, or if Stephen King wrote it?" In January 2017, it was revealed that the show would not be making Jughead asexual, which was revealed in February 2016, stating that the first season was aiming to be an origin story for the 75 years of history. Actor Cole Sprouse stated in an interview that he would like it to be explored in future seasons. 

 Casting 
On February 9, 2016 the first casting announcements were made with Lili Reinhart and Cole Sprouse being announced to be playing Betty Cooper and Jughead Jones respectively. On February 24, 2016 Madelaine Petsch was announced to be playing Cheryl Blossom and Luke Perry of Beverly Hills, 90210 would be playing Fred Andrews, the father of Archie Andrews. That same day it was announced that Ashleigh Murray and KJ Apa would be playing Josie McCoy and Archie Andrews respectively. Apa was one of the last to audition for Archie and got the role after months of searching for an actor. Two days later, it was announced that newcomer Camila Mendes would star as Veronica Lodge. In March 2016, it was announced that her mother, Hermione Lodge, would be played by Marisol Nichols and Betty's mother, Alice Cooper, would be played by Mädchen Amick. 

In March 2016, it was announced that Ross Butler, Daniel Young, and Cody Kearsley would be joining the show in recurring roles as Reggie Mantle, Dilton Doiley, and Moose Mason respectively. That same month it was announced that Casey Cott would star as Kevin Keller, the first openly gay character in the Archie universe. In August 2016, Robin Givens was cast as the mother of Josie McCoy and mayor of Riverdale, while in December 2016 it was announced that Molly Ringwald would appear in a recurring role as Mary Andrews, the mother of Archie Andrews.

 Filming 
Filming for the pilot lasted from March 14 to 31, 2016 in Vancouver, British Columbia. Production on the remaining 12 episodes of season one began on September 7, 2016, in Vancouver and wrapped on December 12, 2016.

 Music 
Riverdale features a number of musical performances throughout the first season, blending a mix of covers and original songs. Songs that are performed in the episode are released as digital singles after the episode airs. WaterTower Music released a digital compilation for songs from the first season on May 12, 2017. The score for the season, composed by Blake Neely, was released on a physical CD by La-La Land Records, and simultaneously on download by WaterTower Music, on July 18, 2017.

 "Bring Em Out" by T.I.
 "Pump It" by The Black Eyed Peas
 "Working for the Weekend" by Josh Gracin
 "Greatest Day" by Bowling for Soup
 "Walking on Sunshine" by Aly & AJ
 "Hollaback Girl" by Gwen Stefani
 "Unwritten" by Natasha Bedingfield
 "Move It Like This" by Baha Men
 "Switch" by Will Smith
 "Days Go By" by Keith Urban
 "Jimmy Neutron Theme" by Bowling for Soup

 Release 
The season began airing on The CW on January 26, 2017 and ended on May 11 of the same year. In late 2016, it was revealed that Netflix in the United Kingdom acquired the rights to air Riverdale less than 24 hours after the episodes premiered.

 Reception 

 Critical response 
On review aggregator website Rotten Tomatoes, the first season holds an approval rating of 88% based on 62 reviews, and an average rating of 7.22/10. The site's critics consensus reads: "Riverdale offers an amusingly self-aware reimagining of its classic source material that proves eerie, odd, daring, and above all addictive." On Metacritic the film has a weighted average score of 68 out of 100, based on 36 critics, indicating "generally favourable reviews."

Speaking positive of the show, Ellen Gray of The Philadelphia Inquirer compared the show to Twin Peaks and Dawson's Creek, and praised the adaptation of the characters. Jeff Jenson of Entertainment Weekly similarly praised the show, stating that Berlanti and Aguirre-Sacasa "built a sturdy, appealing foundation", as well as paying homage to pop culture and "[spitting] on them too." Writing for The Washington Post, Hank Stuever commented on the show's departure from its source material, stating that it's watchable but "entertainment value comes at a steep price, cashing out Archie’s underlying innocence to depict the corrupted community he calls home." Despite the difference from the source material, he praised the show and noted that it "can be terrific once you let go and let Archie grow up his own way" Liz Shannon Miller of IndieWire criticized several stereotypes the show portrayed (such as Kevin being the 'gay best friend'), however commended the show for being "100 percent committed to creating its own little world" and praised the "strong visual choices".

More critical of the series, Ira Madison of MTV News criticized the narration, referring to it as "overwritten and dire" and thought the relationships had "no lasting impact." As well, he disliked the lack of an "outsize metaphor that brings home a point in each episode." Daniel D'Addario of Time also criticized the adaptation from the source material, the voice overs by Cole Sprouse and the many cultural references the show makes. Allison Keene of Collider'' said the series "isn’t as nearly as quirky as its early stylistic flourishes would like to suggest", referring to the series as campy and overwritten. She criticized the inclusion of the murder plot lines, stating the show "missed [an] opportunity to tell a strong, high school-set story".

Ratings

Awards and nominations

Notes

References

External links 
 
 

2017 American television seasons
Riverdale (2017 TV series) episodes